The Solomons monarch (Symposiachrus barbatus), also known as the black-and-white monarch, is a species of bird in the family Monarchidae.  It is endemic to the Solomon Islands archipelago.  Its natural habitat is subtropical or tropical moist lowland forests.  It is threatened by habitat loss.

Taxonomy and systematics
This species was originally placed in the genus Monarcha until moved to Symposiachrus in 2009. Alternate names for the Solomons monarch include the black-throated monarch, black-white monarch, pied monarch, Solomon Islands pied monarch and Solomons pied monarch. The alternate name 'pied monarch' should not be confused with the species of the same name (Arses kaupi).

Subspecies
There are two subspecies recognized: 
 S. b. barbatus - (Ramsay, 1879): Found on the main Solomon Islands
 Malaita monarch (S. b. malaitae) or white-cheeked monarch - (Mayr, 1931): Formerly classified by some authorities as a separate species in the genus Monarcha. Found on Malaita (eastern Solomons)

References

Symposiachrus
Birds described in 1879
Taxonomy articles created by Polbot